Mr Russia is an American garage rock band from Chicago, Illinois, on Lens Records. The band is made up of Ivan (Vocals/Bass) and Josh (Drums).  Excluding guitar from the band's instrumentation, Mr Russia has a unique sound notably drawing inspiration from Bob Haggart's Big Noise From Winnetka. Mr Russia has been compared to modern guitar free band Death from Above 1979, as well as hard-to-pinpoint sources such as XTC and Magazine.

Mr Russia have shared the stage with The Reverend Horton Heat, Girl in a Coma, Von Iva, Thrones, Two Ton Boa, 31 Knots, Earl Greyhound, The Prairie Cartel and Chewing Pics (featuring Naima Mora). They have also toured on their own.

Discography

Albums
 Teething (Lens Records) (2009)
 Training for the Gameshow Host (Lens Records) (2009)

Singles
 "Bang Bang Romance" / "Princess Harming" (2015)
 "XOXO" / "Pretty Girls" (Lens Records)

Compilations
 "Boys Keep Swinging" - .2 Contamination: A Tribute to David Bowie (FTC Records) (2007)
 "Wild World" - Eye For an Eye: A Tribute to Nick Cave (FTC Records) (2008)
 "The National Anthem" - Every Machine Makes A Mistake : A Tribute To Radiohead (FTC Records) (2009)

Videography
 "Bang Bang Romance" directed by John Weaver
 "Skipping Hearts" directed by Bill Holland
 "The New Standard" performed on Chic-a-go-go
 "The National Anthem" directed by Scott Fedor
 "Wild World" utilizing footage from Carnival of Souls directed by Scott Fedor

References

External links
 Official website
 Official MySpace
 Official YouTube

Alternative rock groups from Illinois
Garage rock groups from Illinois
Musical groups from Chicago
Pop punk groups from Illinois
Punk blues musical groups